Local Route 39 Yangju–Dongducheon Line is a local route of South Korea that connecting Yangju to Dongducheon, Gyeonggi Province.

History
The route was originally planned as an extension of National Route 39 to Dongducheon but was instead designated as a state-funded local route on 19 July 1996, running from Uijeongbu to Dongducheon. In 2012 the route was shortened to Yangju.

Stopovers
 Gyeonggi Province
 Yangju - Dongducheon

Major intersections 

 (■): Motorway
IS: Intersection, IC: Interchange

Gyeonggi Province

See also 
 Roads and expressways in South Korea
 Transportation in South Korea

References

External links 
 MOLIT South Korean Government Transport Department

39
Roads in Gyeonggi